Adherens junctions (or zonula adherens, intermediate junction, or "belt desmosome") are protein complexes that occur at cell–cell junctions and cell–matrix junctions in epithelial and endothelial tissues, usually more basal than tight junctions. An adherens junction is defined as a cell junction whose cytoplasmic face is linked to the actin cytoskeleton. 
They can appear as bands encircling the cell (zonula adherens) or as spots of attachment to the extracellular matrix (focal adhesion).

Adherens junctions uniquely disassemble in uterine epithelial cells to allow the blastocyst to penetrate between epithelial cells.

A similar cell junction in non-epithelial, non-endothelial cells is the fascia adherens.  It is structurally the same, but appears in ribbonlike patterns that do not completely encircle the cells.  One example is in cardiomyocytes.

Proteins
Adherens junctions are composed of the following proteins: 
 cadherins. The cadherins are a family of transmembrane proteins that form homodimers in a calcium-dependent manner with other cadherin molecules on adjacent cells.  
 p120 (sometimes called delta catenin) binds the juxtamembrane region of the cadherin.
 γ-catenin or gamma-catenin (plakoglobin) binds the catenin-binding region of the cadherin.
 α-catenin or alpha-catenin binds the cadherin indirectly via β-catenin or plakoglobin and links the actin cytoskeleton with cadherin.  Significant protein dynamics are thought to be involved.

Models
Adherens junctions were, for many years, thought to share the characteristic of anchor cells through their cytoplasmic actin filaments.

Adherens junctions may serve as a regulatory module to maintain the actin contractile ring with which it is associated in microscopic studies.

See also
 Tight junction

References

External links

 MBInfo - Adherens Junction
 MBInfo - Adherens Junction Assembly
 
 

Cell anatomy